Zabełków  (formerly German Zabelkau, 1936–1945: Schurgersdorf) is a village in the administrative district of Gmina Krzyżanowice, within Racibórz County, Silesian Voivodeship, in southern Poland, close to the Czech border. It has a population of about 750.

Józef Rymer, first Silesian voivode, was born here.

References

Villages in Racibórz County